Chester Nelsen may refer to:

 Chester Nelsen Sr. (1902–1987), American Olympic cyclist who competed in the 1928 Summer Olympics
 Chester Nelsen Jr. (1922–2018), American Olympic cyclist who competed in the 1948 Summer Olympics